The Innerer Fisistock is a mountain of the Bernese Alps, overlooking Kandersteg in the Bernese Oberland. It lies at the western end the Blüemlisalp chain.

References

External links
 Innerer Fisistock on Hikr

Mountains of the Alps
Mountains of Switzerland
Mountains of the canton of Bern
Two-thousanders of Switzerland